Hallroom Boys, also sometimes written as Hall-Room Boys or Hall Room Boys, was a comic strip, vaudeville act, and a comedy short film series that included various actors, including Edward Flanagan, Neely Edwards, and Sid Smith. Pathescope reissued the films in Europe.

Filmography
Taming the West (1919)

References

Vaudeville
1919 films
Short film series